Angas is a surname. Notable people with the surname include:

Caleb Angas (1782–1860), English agriculturist
Charles Howard Angas (1861–1928), pastoralist in South Australia, son of John Howard Angas
George Fife Angas (1789–1879), English businessman and banker, later prominent in South Australia
George French Angas (1822–1886), English explorer, naturalist and painter, son of George Fife Angas
John Howard Angas (1823–1904), South Australian pastoralist, politician and philanthropist, son of George Fife Angas
Richard Angas (1942–2013), British operatic bass singer
Sarah Lindsay Angas (1816–1898), South Australian temperance activist, daughter of George Fife Angas
William Henry Angas (1781–1832), English missionary